The 1938 Walker Cup, the 10th Walker Cup Match, was played on 3 and 4 June 1938, on the Old Course at St Andrews, Scotland. Great Britain and Ireland won by 7 matches to 4 with one match halved. It was their first victory in the Walker Cup.

Great Britain & Ireland took a one point lead after the first day foursomes. On the second day they won 5 of the 8 singles matches. They took a winning 6–4 lead when Alex Kyle beat Fred Haas, later increased to 7–4 when Cecil Ewing beat Ray Billows on the final green.

Format
Four 36-hole matches of foursomes were played on Friday and eight singles matches on Saturday. Each of the 12 matches was worth one point in the larger team competition. If a match was all square after the 36th hole extra holes were not played. The team with most points won the competition. If the two teams were tied, the previous winner would retain the trophy.

Teams
The United States selected a team of 8 and a non-playing captain in January. Great Britain and Ireland selected their captain, John Beck, in February, initially as a non-player. 8 members of the British team were selected in early May, at which time Beck was given the option of playing himself if he chose. Cecil Ewing was selected as the final member of the team in late May, after reaching the final of the Amateur Championship. In the end, Beck did not select himself for any matches. Ewing did not play in the foursomes but replaced Harry Bentley in the singles.

Great Britain & Ireland
 & 
Playing captain:  John Beck
 Harry Bentley
 Jimmy Bruen
 Leonard Crawley
 Cecil Ewing
 Alex Kyle
 Frank Pennink
 Gordon Peters
 Charlie Stowe
 Hector Thomson

United States

Captain: Francis Ouimet
Ray Billows
Johnny Fischer
Johnny Goodman
Fred Haas
Chuck Kocsis
Reynolds Smith
Bud Ward
Charlie Yates

Friday's foursomes

Saturday's singles

References

Walker Cup
Golf tournaments in Scotland
Walker Cup
Walker Cup
Walker Cup